Events in the year 2020 in the Comoros.

Incumbents 

 President: Azali Assoumani

Events 
Ongoing – COVID-19 pandemic in the Comoros

April 

 15 April – A person arriving in Mayotte from the country tested positive for COVID-19.
 16 April – Dominique Voynet, Director of Mayotte Regional Health Agency, announced that a person who died on 8 April before being evacuated to Mayotte on the basis of a x-ray of COVID-19 was Said Toihir, the Grand Mufti of the country. The announcement caused a diplomatic rift between the country and France. Mohamed El-Amine Souef, the Foreign Minister, said "If a case is confirmed in the Comoros, it is not Dominique Voynet to announce it, we have been independent since 6 July 1975."
 17 April – The World Health Organization delivered medical aid to the country.
 22 April – A polymerase chain reaction (PCR) screening machine was delivered to the country, allowing for COVID-19 testing the country starting on 23 April.
 30 April – The first case of COVID-19 in the country was confirmed: a 50-year-old man who was admitted to the El-Maarouf hospital in Moroni on 23 April. The patient had been in contact with a Franco-Comorian national on 18 March. As a result of the confirmation, President Azali Assoumani disclosed that a curfew had been instituted.

May 

 2 May – A video conference was held between President Assoumani and President Rajoelina of Madagascar. Madagascar will send medical aid to the country.
 4 May – The first COVID-19 death in the country was reported.
 6 May – President Azali Assoumani announced that total confinement is not an option for the islands. A donation of 100,000 face masks had been received, and India will be sending medical supplies and doctors to support the local health care.
 8 May – UNICEF donated 5 ventilators to the Ministry of Health. Comoros had nearly 25 ventilators on the three islands.
 13 May – The United Nations donated 1,000 rapid tests to the Ministry of Health.
 16 May – The first repatriation flight arrived from Tanzania with 134 people on board, with 70 people returned from Kenya. Two more flights are planned to arrive from Tanzania on 17 May.
 19 May – The presence of COVID-19 on Anjouan (Ngazidja) was confirmed, making the virus now active on all major islands.
 21 May – The Grand Mufti requested that the people celebrate Eid al-Fitr at home as a result of the pandemic.

July 

 8 July – The President made wearing face masks outdoors mandatory on the whole territory.
 21 July – The island of Mohéli reported that it no longer had active COVID-19 cases.

Deaths

See also 

 List of years in the Comoros

References 

 
2020s in the Comoros
Comoros
Comoros
Years of the 21st century in the Comoros